William Sheffield Paul was a politician in Queensland, Australia. He was a Member of the Queensland Legislative Assembly.

Early life 
William Sheffield Paul was the son of Edward Paul and Jane (née Sheffield) and attended City of London School in England. He migrated to Sydney in 1853 and commenced business with his brother as general merchants under E & W Paul. He migrated in 1862 to Queensland, became involved in Glendarriwill Station, Springsure; and became General shipping manager for Associated Collieries Newcastle, and from 1878; Manager for William Sloane & Co, Brisbane; he was involved in dividing runs commissioner under Crown Lands Act of 1884, Queensland; New South Wales government run appraiser, 1887.

Politics 
Paul was a member for Leichhardt in the Queensland Legislative Assembly from 1878 to 1879 and then again from 1888 to 1893.

Later life 
Paul was re-appointed as runs commissioner in Queensland, 1894 - 1897; then Clerk to the Queensland Government Agency, London, 1898 - 1902. He married Maria Smith on 1 July 1899  and they had a son and a daughter.

Paul died on 30 November 1902.

References

Members of the Queensland Legislative Assembly
1832 births
1902 deaths
19th-century Australian politicians